Donnchad Donn mac Flainn (Duncan of the Brown Hair, son of Flann) (died 944) was High King of Ireland and King of Mide. He belonged to Clann Cholmáin, a branch of the southern Uí Néill.

Origins
Donnchad was the son of High King Flann Sinna by his wife Gormlaith ingen Flann mac Conaing. The date of his birth is not known, but he was apparently an adult in 904 when he is found as the leader, or figurehead, of a challenge to his father at Kells. The Annals of Ulster state that many of Donnchad's associates were beheaded by Flann, and that the High King profaned the sanctuary at Kells to seize Donnchad.

Donnchad again rebelled against his father in 915, with the support of his brother Conchobar, but this rebellion was suppressed by his sister Gormlaith's husband, and his father's heir, Niall Glúndub. When Flann died in 916, Niall Glúndub succeeded him as King of Tara, while Conchobar became King of Mide, the kingship of Clann Cholmáin.

Niall and Conchobar were both killed on 14 September 919, in battle against the Foreigners—Vikings and Norse-Gaels—at Dublin. Other Irish kings and princes among the dead were another of Donnchad's sister's husbands, Máel Mithig mac Flannacáin, Niall Glúndub's brother's son and heir-designate Flaithbertach mac Domnaill, "and many other nobles".

Donnchad succeeded to the kingship of Mide, and to the high kingship of Ireland. He immediately had his brother Áed blinded. Two years later, Donnchad disposed of another brother, the annals saying: "Domnall grandson of Máel Sechnaill was deceitfully killed by his brother Donnchad, which was fitting." Some years later, Donnchad disposed of his nephew, Máel Ruanaid, Conchobar's son.

Reign
Donnchad's first venture was a campaign against armies of the Foreigners in modern County Louth,  "in which a very large number [of the Foreigners] were slaughtered." The majority of the reports of battles with the Foreigners thereafter in Donnchad's reign concern "the Hector of the western world", the indefatigable Muirchertach mac Néill—Muirchertach of the Leather Cloaks—the King of Ailech and likely to have been Donnchad's successor had he not died in battle against the Foreigners on 26 February 943. Donnchad's relations with Muirchertach, his daughter's husband, were not good, and conflict between them is recorded in 927, 929, and 938. Muirchertach's wife died in 940, and in 941 he raided Mide, Osraige, and Munster, taking the Munster king Cellachán Caisil hostage as a demonstration of his power, and Donnchad's limited authority.

On Donnchad's death, he was succeeded as King of Tara by his sister's son, Congalach Cnogba, a member of the Síl nÁedo Sláine branch of the Uí Néill. Donnchad's son Óengus became King of Mide.

Family
Donnchad was married three times. His first wife was Cainnech ingen Canannán (died 929), daughter of the King of the northern Uí Néill sept of the Cenél Conaill. His second wife was Órlaith íngen Cennétig, sister of Brian Boru of the Dál gCais. Órlaith was killed in 941, apparently on Donnchad's order, perhaps due to a sexual relationship between her and her stepson Óengus. Donnchad's third wife, Dub Lémna ingen Tighearnáin (died in 943), was the daughter of the king of Bréifne. Charles Doherty notes that Donnchad's wives all came from rising families. The Ua Canannáin of Tír Ċonaill, the Dál gCais of Thomond, and the Ua Ruairc of Bréifne were among the leading families of the 11th and 12th centuries.

Donnchad's sons included Conn (died 944), Óengus his successor (died 945), Domnall Donn (died 952), the father of future King of Tara Máel Sechnaill mac Domnaill. His daughters were Flann ingen Donnchadha (died 940), wife of Muirchertach mac Néill, and Óebfhinn ingen Donnchadha (died 952).

His sister and only known full-sibling, Gormflaith ingen Flann Sinna (c.870–948), was Queen of Tara.

Family tree

         Gormlaith ingen Flann mac Conaing = Flann Sinna = other wives.
                                           |             |
      _|         |
     |                                          |        |        |             |       |    |          |        |       |
     |                                          |        |        |             |       |    |          |        |       |
     Donnchad Donn                       Gormflaith Cerball Máel Ruanaid  Óengus  Áed Conchobar Donnell Lígach Muirgel
   = Cainnech ingen Canannán (d. 929)
   = Órlaith íngen Cennétig (ex. 941)
   = Dub Lemna ingen Tighearnáin (d. 943)
     |
     |_
     |              |                  |                          |                         |
     |              |                  |                          |                         |
     Donn (d. 944)  Óengus (died 945) Domnall Donn (died 952) Flann (died 940)          Óebfhinn (died 952).
                                       |                        = Muirechertach mac Néill
                                       |                          |
                                       |                          |
                       Máel Sechnaill mac Domnaill Domnall ua Néill

Notes

References
 
 Byrne, Francis John, Irish Kings and High-Kings. Batsford, London, 1973. 
 

9th-century births
944 deaths
Kings of Mide
People from County Meath
10th-century High Kings of Ireland